Christian Lee Hutson (born November 5, 1990) is an American singer, musician and songwriter. He began his career as a member of The Driftwood Singers, before signing to ANTI‐ as a solo artist in 2019. Hutson has since released two full-length albums: Beginners (2020) and Quitters (2022). Both records were co-produced by his friend and fellow musician, Phoebe Bridgers.

In addition to his collaborations with Bridgers, Hutson is known for co-writing and performing songs with Samia, Marshall Vore, Whitmer Thomas, Conor Oberst and Ethan Gruska.

Early life 
Hutson was born in Kansas City, Missouri on November 5, 1990. He relocated to Los Angeles, California at the age of five; shortly after his mother remarried. According to a 2020 Under The Radar profile, Hutson attended a fundamentalist Christian elementary school.

Hutson began playing guitar at the age of 12; the first song that he learned to play was Elizabeth Cotten’s ‘Freight Train’. His earliest attempts at songwriting were influenced by vintage country records housed within his father’s record collection, including those released by Hank Williams.

As a teenager, Hutson enjoyed the music of John Prine, Bright Eyes and Elliott Smith. He ultimately dropped out of high school to pursue a musical career – a decision that was not supported by his parents. Hutson’s adolescent experiences later inspired the lyrics of ‘Northsiders’ and ‘Seven Lakes’, which are included on the 2020 album Beginners.

Career

The Driftwood Singers (c. 2010–2013) 
Prior to embarking on a solo career, Hutson performed with Pearl Charles in The Driftwood Singers. The Driftwood Singers were described as having “an affinity and talent for the traditional country folk sound” in a 2011 Amarillo Globe-News profile. They began as an eight-piece ensemble, composed of students from the California Institute of the Arts, before reforming as a duo.

Hutson and Charles released their first EP, Look!, in November 2011. The Driftwood Singers also released a single, 'I Don't Live Here Anymore', and a self-titled album in 2012. By February 2013, Hutson and Charles had ended their musical partnership.

Solo career and collaborations with Phoebe Bridgers (2014–2019) 
Hutson recorded his debut EP, We Will Never Break Up, in 2012. His first solo album, The Hell With It, was released on the independent label Trailer Fire Records the following year.

Trailer Fire Records also released Hutson’s sophomore solo record, Yeah Okay, I Know, in 2014. The album was produced by Grammy Award nominee David Mayfield. It spawned numerous singles, such as ‘They’re Gonna Hate Me’, ‘Dirty Little Cheat’ and ‘Mess’. As with The Hell With It, Yeah Okay, I Know was not widely reviewed and is not available on any streaming services.

Hutson was introduced to Phoebe Bridgers by her touring guitarist, Harrison Whitford, in 2018. Hutson has since co-written numerous songs on three projects featuring Bridgers – boygenius (2018), Better Oblivion Community Center (2019) and Punisher (2020). He also supported Bridgers on her 2019 world tour, and performed in the same capacity for boygenius’s 2019 European tour.

Hutson performed as a touring guitarist for Jenny Lewis during this time, in addition to supporting musical acts like Julia Jacklin and Okkervil River.

Beginners and The Version Suicides (2020–2021) 
Hutson was signed to ANTI– in 2019. He released his first studio album, Beginners, on May 29, 2020. Beginners was named after the Raymond Carver short story cycle of the same name. Maeri Ferguson describes the album as “a spare and quiet collection of songs about the tenderness of adolescence, first love, heartbreak and the value of having a little perspective”. It was preceded by the single ‘Northsiders’.

Beginners was produced by Phoebe Bridgers. Prior to the recording sessions with Bridgers, four versions of Beginners were completed. The first was assisted by Dawes and Dash Hutton, a former drummer for the band Haim, and recorded in 2015. The third version was produced by Ethan Gruska, who has previously collaborated with Fiona Apple and Blake Mills. Meanwhile, the second and fourth versions were produced by unknown parties and failed to materialise.

The final version of Beginners features contributions from Lucy Dacus, Conor Oberst and Meg Duffy of Hand Habits. It was well-received by critics; earning a score of 7.8 from Pitchfork, alongside a Metascore of 75 that signals ‘mostly positive reviews’.

Hutson also released three EPs between 2020 and 2021, which are collectively known as ‘The Version Suicides’. The three volumes feature contributions from musicians like Shamir, Fenne Lily and Julia Jacklin, and involve a combination of humorous and sincere covers. Liz Phair’s ‘Why Can’t I?’, Taylor Swift’s ‘betty’ and The Cure’s ‘Just Like Heaven’ rank amongst the songs that Hutson has covered.

Before the release of Quitters in 2022, Hutson also performed on projects released by Hand Habits, Ada Lea, Whitmer Thomas and Sasami.

Quitters (2022 –) 
Hutson began writing Quitters, his second album to be released via ANTI-, during the COVID-19 quarantine. The record was produced by Phoebe Bridgers and Conor Oberst and ultimately released on April 1, 2022. Quitters was preceded by the lead single ‘Rubberneckers’, which was co-written by Alex Lahey and Phoebe Bridgers. Two additional singles, ‘Age Difference’ and ‘Strawberry Lemonade’, have also been released in support of the album.

Hutson states that, lyrically, Quitters touches on “adult experiences and changes and trying to become okay with yourself”. The LP also draws from numerous influences, including the Sofia Coppola film Somewhere, The Sarah Book by Scott McClanahan and the Paolo Sorrentino film Youth. Quitters was recorded directly to analog tape – rather than in digital format – in an attempt to add warmth to the arrangements.

Like its predecessor, Quitters was reviewed by music publications like Pitchfork and The Line of Best Fit. Pitchfork bestowed a rating of 7.5 upon the album, which also received a 74 Metascore that suggests ‘generally favourable reviews’.

As of February 2023, Hutson is opening for Phoebe Bridgers on her international Reunion Tour.

Musical style 
Rolling Stone describes Hutson’s music as a combination of “folk”, “Americana” and “retro-country”, while Hutson cites his musical influences as Elliott Smith, Hank Williams, Gillian Welch, Randy Newman and John Prine.

Hutson plays acoustic guitar, banjo, mandolin and fiddle in addition to singing. His early recordings possess a DIY or lo-fi quality; Bridgers attempted to preserve the “homespun” nature of Hutson’s original Voice Memo demos when producing Beginners.

Hutson also enjoys the prose of George Saunders, Haruki Murakami, Sally Rooney and Raymond Carver, and claims that all four authors have informed his songwriting.

Personal life 
Hutson is married to Los Angeles singer-songwriter Sharon Silva.

Hutson has also been diagnosed with Pure OCD; he describes writing the Quitters song ‘OCDemon’ as a “therapeutic exercise”.

In 2020, Hutson gave free guitar lessons over Zoom to support the Black Lives Matter movement. He has also supported various bail projects throughout the United States.

Hutson has several tattoos, one of which pays tribute to Hank Williams.

Discography

Studio albums

Extended plays

Singles

References

Musicians from Los Angeles
1990 births
Living people
Anti- (record label) artists